is a Japanese screenwriter and musician.

Having begun scriptwriting at a young age and writing scripts for various companies, Satō later focused his attention on writing for anime series. The first major series he worked on was the groundbreaking 1998 Sunrise series Cowboy Bebop, after which he worked on other well-known series, such as Ghost in the Shell: Stand Alone Complex and Wolf's Rain. In 2005, Satō was the chief writer of Psalms of Planets Eureka Seven, for which he received an award for best screenplay at the Tokyo International Anime Fair in 2006.

In 2006 and 2007, Satō worked on the Sunrise OVA series Freedom Project (which featured director Katsuhiro Otomo).

Satō also created his own consultant company, Frognation, with two of his acquaintances, which incorporated he and his friend Kengo Watanabe's own electronic music label Frogman Records.

In 2007, after leaving Frognation, Satō established his own company Storyriders.

Major works

Anime television series

 Cowboy Bebop (1998–1999): script, stage setting cooperation
 "Jamming with Edward"
 "Bohemian Rhapsody"
 "Brain Scratch"
 Ghost in the Shell: Stand Alone Complex (2002–2003): script
 "C: The Man Who Dwells in the Shadows of the Net – CHAT! CHAT! CHAT!"
 "SA: A Perfect Day for a Jungle Cruise – JUNGLE CRUISE"
 "C: Vanished Medication – RE-VIEW"
 "C: Left-Behind Trace – ERASER"
 "C: Public Security Section 9, Once Again – STAND ALONE COMPLEX"
 Wolf's Rain (2003): script 
 "The Flower Maiden"
 "Misgivings"
 "Vanishing Point"
 "The Fallen Keep"
 "Battle's Red Glare"
 "Heartbeat of the Black City"
 "Moonlight Crucible"
 Ghost in the Shell: S.A.C. 2nd GIG (2004): script
 "DI: Saturday Night and Sunday Morning – CASH EYE"
 "IN: Those Who Have the Motive – INDUCTANCE"
 "DI: Vegetarian Dinner – FAKE FOOD"
 "DU: The Hope Named Despair – AMBIVALENCE"
 "DU: Abandoned City – REVERSAL PROCESS"
 Samurai Champloo (2004): script
 "Artistic Anarchy"
 "The Art of Altercation"
 "Beatbox Bandits"
 "War of the Words"
 "Cosmic Collisions"
 Kenran Butohsai (2004): script
 "Bizarre! The Ghost Ship Drift Zone"
 "Enter! Hakubutsu Ship, Eichi's Castle!"
 "Good-bye My Friend! A Man's Dream Lasts Forever"
 "The Dawn of Mars! Mars Daybreak"
 Eureka Seven (2005–2006): series composition, script
 "Blue Monday"
 "Blue Sky Fish"
 "Motion Blue"
 "Watermelon"
 "Paper Moon Shine"
 "Acperience 1"
 "Memory Band"
 "Crackpot"
 "Helter Skelter"
 "Pacific State"
 "Date of Birth"
 "Shout to the Top!"
 "Wish Upon a Star"
 Ergo Proxy (2006–2007): chief writer, screenplay
 "Pulse of Awakening/Awakening"
 "Confession of a Fellow Citizen/Confession"
 "Leap into the Void/Mazecity"
 "Signs of Future, Hades of Future/Futu-Risk"
 "RE-L124C41+"
 "Light Beam/Shining Sign"
 "In the White Darkness/Anamnesis"
 "Nightmare Quiz Show/Who Wants to Be in Jeopardy!"
 "The Girl with a Smile/Eternal Smile"
 "Proxy/Deus ex Machina"
 Toward the Terra (2007): script
 "The Lonesome Mu"
 "Red Eyes, Blue Planet"
 "Eternity and the Heat Haze"
Battle Spirits: Shounen Toppa Bashin (2008–2009): series composition, script
"Front Breaking Bashin Enters Stage!"
"The Rival's Name is J"
"Arrival of the Gunslinger's Apparition!"
"First Final is Smile After Tears"
"Batosupi Under the Sakura"
"Middle School Uniforms New School Uniforms"
"Break Through From the Front Showtime- The Curtain Raised!"
"The Last Opponent Nine- The Last Battle"
"Take it From the Life! Shine, Cornerstone's Settlement!"
"Miracle Card Battler- Bashin Breaks Through From the Front!"
 Eden of the East (2009): screenplay
 "On the Night of the Late Show"
 "Search for a Fore-Lost Journey"
 Lupin the Third: The Woman Called Fujiko Mine (2012): script
 "The Girl and the Samurai"
 "Magic and Revolution"
 "Dead City"
 Chō Soku Henkei Gyrozetter (2012–2013): series composition (story riders), script
 "Raibird to the Front!"
 "The Secret of the Rosettagraphy"
 "Appearance! Eraser-01!"
 "Clash! Raibird vs Guiltice!"
 "Complete! Raibird Hyper Spec"
 "The Nightmare of Great Kraken"
 "Hyper Speed Special Showcasing All of Gyrozetter"
 "RRR Awakens! Secret of the Burst Core"
 "The Saki from the future"
 "Roar! Moebius Overdrive!"
 Space Dandy (2014): script
 "The Search For the Phantom Space Ramen, Baby"
 "The War of the Undies and Vests, Baby"
 "Even Vacuum Cleaners Fall in Love, Baby"
 "To Be Judged Is Dandy, Baby"
 Dai-Shogun - Great Revolution (2014): series composition
 Mysterious Joker (2014–2015): series composition
 "Paris and the 100-Year Safe"
 "The Shadow Descends"
 "The Labyrinth of Shadows and Mirrors"
 "Light and Shadow Jokers"
Puzzle & Dragons X (2016–2018): series composition (story riders), script
 "Drop Impact"
Listeners (2020): script
Ghost in the Shell: SAC_2045 (2020): script
 "IDENTITY THEFT - The Lonely Struggle"
Super Crooks (2021): script
Yurei Deco (2022): series composition

OVA
 Eternal Family (1997): Screenplay
 Ghost in the Shell: Stand Alone Complex – The Laughing Man (2005): Screenplay
 Ghost in the Shell: S.A.C. 2nd GIG – Individual Eleven (2006): Screenplay
 Freedom Project (2006): Series Composition, Scenario
 Halo Legends (2010): Screenplay
 "The Package"
 Five Numbers! (2011): Screenplay, Original Development

Films
 Casshern (2004): Screenplay
 Tekken: Blood Vengeance (2011): Screenplay
 Psalm of Planets Eureka Seven: Hi-Evolution 1 (2017): Script
 Altered Carbon: Resleeved (2020): Screenplay
 Words Bubble Up Like Soda Pop (2021): Script
 Doraemon: Nobita's Little Star Wars 2021 (2022): Screenplay
 Break of Dawn (2022): Screenplay

Video games
 Ace Combat 3 (1999): Screenplay
 Blood: The Last Vampire (2000): Screenplay
 Ghost in the Shell: Stand Alone Complex (2004): Screenplay
 Resident Evil: Revelations (2012): Chief script writer
 E.X. Troopers (2012): Story
 Resident Evil: Revelations 2 (2015): Chief script writer

References

 Gifford, Kevin. "Ergo Proxy". (November 2006) Newtype USA. p. 148.

External links
Official Frognation website
Official Storyriders website
Storyriders on Twitter (Japanese)
 Dai Sato anime listing at Media Arts Database 

 
 Storywriter Sato Dai is frustrated with Japanese anime

1969 births
Anime screenwriters
Japanese screenwriters
Living people
Video game writers